Anchusa capensis, is a species of flowering plant in the family Boraginaceae, native to Namibia, South Africa and Lesotho. The genus Anchusa is from the Greek word anchousa, which makes reference to its use as a dye base for cosmetic paint obtained from the roots of another plant in the genus Anchusa tinctoria. The species capensis translates to ‘from the Cape’ referring to South Africa 

In summer, red buds open to reveal small, bright cobalt blue flowers with five petals and five white scales protecting the stigma and anthers.

In the US, it grows well in zones 8–11. Cultivars include 'Dawn', with white, pink, mauve and blue flowers, 'Blue Angel', with dark blue flowers, and 'Blue Bird', taller and with indigo blue flowers.

Common Names 

 Bugloss
 Cape Forget-Me Not
 Summer Forget-Me Not
 Vergeet-My-Nietjie
 Ystergras 
 Koringblom
 Ossetongblaar (Afr.)
 Petlekheme (Sesotho)
 Alkanet

References

capensis
Garden plants of Africa
Flora of Namibia
Flora of South Africa
Flora of Lesotho
Plants described in 1794